Guarianthe aurantiaca is a species of orchid. It is widespread across much of Mexico, south to Costa Rica. The diploid chromosome number of G. aurantiaca has been determined as 2n = 40.

The phananthrenoids orchinol and loroglossol have a phytoalexin effect and reduce the growth of G. aurantiaca seedlings.

References

aurantiaca
Orchids of Mexico
Orchids of Central America
Plants described in 1838